Gadzhimurad Antigulov (born January 1, 1987) is a Russian mixed martial artist who currently competing in the Light Heavyweight division. A professional since 2009, he has  fought for the Ultimate Fighting Championship (UFC), M-1 Global, and Absolute Championship Berkut, where he was a two-time light heavyweight champion.

Background
As wrestling is the national sport in Dagestan,  Antigulov started training wrestling at the young age and  transitioned to MMA when the sport was introduced to his country.

He splits his training into two sessions per day. He starts with a run and then focuses on striking skills and wrestling on the second part of the morning training. A second training session will follow later of the day after a rest during the early afternoon. He also train with American Top team for his fights.

Mixed martial arts career

Early career
Antigulov fought in the Russian circuit for 9 years,  and he was the two times light heavyweight champion for Absolute Championship Berkut. He amassed a record of  18-4 prior joining UFC.

Ultimate Fighting Championship
Antigulov made his promotional debut on November 19, 2016 at UFC Fight Night: Bader vs. Nogueira 2 against Marcos Rogério de Lima. He took his first UFC win via a guillotine choke on 67 seconds into round one. He earned the Performance of the Night bonus.

Antigulov was expected to face Ed Herman at UFC 209 on March 4, 2017. The bout was removed due to Herman citing injury.

On May 13, 2017, Antigulov faced Joachim Christensen at UFC 211.  He won the fight via a rear-naked choke in the first round.

Antigulov was scheduled to face Ion Cuțelaba on November 4, 2017 at UFC 217. However, Antigulov pulled out of the fight on September 26 citing an injury, and was replaced by newcomer Michał Oleksiejczuk.

Antigulov was expected to face Aleksandar Rakić on February 24, 2018 at UFC on Fox 28. However, it was reported on February 7, 2018 that Antigulov was pulled from the fight, citing injury, as a result, the bout was cancelled.

The bout with Ion Cuțelaba eventually took place on July 28, 2018 at UFC on Fox 30. Antigulov lost the fight via TKO in the first round.

Antigulov was reported to face Sam Alvey on February 23, 2019 at UFC Fight Night 145. However, on January 25, 2019, it was reported that Alvey would face Jim Crute at UFC 234 instead.

Antigulov was briefly linked to a bout to face newcomer Roman Dolidze on April 20, 2019 at UFC Fight Night 149. However, Dolidze was replaced just days later for undisclosed reasons by Michał Oleksiejczuk. Antigulov lost the fight via knockout in the first round.

Antigulov was expected to face Ed Herman on November 9, 2019 at UFC Fight Night 163. However, on October 29, 2019 it was reported that he was pulled from the bout for undisclosed reason.

Antigulov was scheduled to face Devin Clark on February 15, 2020 at UFC Fight Night 167. However, Antigulov was pulled from the event for undisclosed reason and he was replaced by Dequan Townsend. 

Antigulov was scheduled to face Klidson Abreu on June 13, 2020 at UFC Kazakhstan. However, the event for Kazakhstan was later cancelled due to the COVID-19 pandemic.

Antigulov faced Paul Craig on July 26, 2020 at UFC on ESPN 14. He lost the fight via a triangle choke in round one.

Antigulov faced Maxim Grishin on October 18, 2020 at UFC Fight Night 180. He lost the fight via technical knockout in round two.

On December 8, 2020, it was announced that the UFC had released him.

Post-UFC career
As the first bout after the release Antigulov faced Vitor Petrino at UAE Warriors 22 on September 4, 2021. He lost the fight via second-round technical knockout.

Antigulov faced Viktor Vecherin on March 25, 2022 at AMC Fight Nights 110. He won the bout via second round TKO victory.

Championships and accomplishments

Mixed martial arts
Absolute Championship Berkut (ACB)
ACB Light Heavyweight Championship (Two times) vs. Ruslan Khaskhanov and Muslim Makhmudov
One successful title defense
Ultimate Fighting Championship
Performance of the Night (One times) vs. Marcos Rogério de Lima

Mixed martial arts record

|-
|Win
|align=center|21–9
|Viktor Vecherin
|TKO (punches)
|AMC Fight Nights 110
|
|align=center|2
|align=center|2:39
|Astrakhan, Russia
|
|-
|Loss
|align=center|20–9
|Vitor Petrino
|TKO (punches)
|UAE Warriors 22
|
|align=center|2
|align=center|3:36
|Abu Dhabi, United Arab Emirates
|
|-
|Loss
|align=center|20–8
|Maxim Grishin
|TKO (punches)
|UFC Fight Night: Ortega vs. The Korean Zombie
|
|align=center|2
|align=center|4:57
|Abu Dhabi, United Arab Emirates
|
|-
|Loss
|align=center|20–7
|Paul Craig
|Submission (triangle choke)
|UFC on ESPN: Whittaker vs. Till 
|
|align=center|1
|align=center|2:06
|Abu Dhabi, United Arab Emirates
|
|-
|Loss
|align=center|20–6
|Michał Oleksiejczuk
|KO (punches)
|UFC Fight Night: Overeem vs. Oleinik 
|
|align=center|1
|align=center|0:44
|Saint Petersburg, Russia
|
|-
|Loss
|align=center|20–5
|Ion Cuțelaba
|TKO (punches)
|UFC on Fox: Alvarez vs. Poirier 2 
|
|align=center|1
|align=center|4:25
|Calgary, Alberta, Canada
|
|-
| Win
| align=center| 20–4
| Joachim Christensen
| Submission (rear-naked choke)
| UFC 211
| 
| align=center| 1
| align=center| 2:21
| Dallas, Texas, United States
|
|-
| Win
| align=center| 19–4
| Marcos Rogério de Lima
| Submission (guillotine choke)
| UFC Fight Night: Bader vs. Nogueira 2
| 
| align=center| 1
| align=center| 1:07
| São Paulo, Brazil
| 
|-
| Win
| align=center| 18–4
| Muslim Makhmudov
| Submission (rear-naked choke)
| ACB 35
| 
| align=center| 2
| align=center| 4:21
| Tbilisi, Georgia
|
|-
| Win
| align=center| 17–4
| Jorge Luis Bezerra
| TKO (punches)
| ACB 27
| 
| align=center| 1
| align=center| 2:00
| Dushanbe, Tajikistan
|
|-
| Win
| align=center| 16–4
| Cassio Barbosa de Oliveira
| TKO (punches)
| ACB 20
| 
| align=center| 1
| align=center| 0:12
| Sochi, Russia
|
|-
| Win
| align=center| 15–4
| Artur Astakhov
| Submission (rear-naked choke)
| Union MMA Pro
| 
| align=center| 1
| align=center| 0:33
| Krasnodar, Russia
|
|-
| Win
| align=center| 14–4
| Hracho Darpinyan
| Decision (unanimous)
| ACB Grand Prix Berkut 11
| 
| align=center| 3
| align=center| 5:00
| Grozny, Russia
|
|-
| Win
| align=center| 13–4
| Ruslan Khaskhanov
| TKO (punches)
| ACB Grand Prix Berkut 9
| 
| align=center| 1
| align=center| 3:53
| Grozny, Russia
| 
|-
| Win
| align=center| 12–4
| Nikolai Boyarczuk
| Submission (guillotine choke)
| ACB Grand Prix Berkut 7
| 
| align=center| 1
| align=center| 0:42
| Grozny, Russia
|
|-
| Win
| align=center| 11–4
| Mikhail Bureshkin
| Submission (rear-naked choke)
| ACB Grand Prix Berkut 6
| 
| align=center| 1
| align=center| 1:47
| Grozny, Russia
|
|-
| Win
| align=center| 10–4
| Ilya Kolodyazhny
| TKO (punches)
| ACB Grand Prix Berkut 3
| 
| align=center| 1
| align=center| 0:47
| Grozny, Russia
| 
|-
| Win
| align=center| 9–4
| Roman Ishchenko
| Submission (anaconda choke)
| Oplot Challenge 96
| 
| align=center| 1
| align=center| 1:25
| Kharkov, Ukraine
|
|-
| Win
| align=center| 8–4
| Muslim Tutaev
| Submission (armbar)
| Versia Fighting Championship 2
| 
| align=center| 1
| align=center| 0:35
| Pyatigorsk, Russia
|
|-
| Win
| align=center| 7–4
| Magomed Sharudinov
| Submission (kneebar)
| Versia Fighting Championship 2
| 
| align=center| 1
| align=center| 2:24
| Pyatigorsk, Russia
|
|-
| Loss
| align=center| 6–4
| Reinaldo da Silva
| Submission (armbar)
| Legion Fight 14
| 
| align=center| 1
| align=center| 2:55
| Taganrog, Russia
|
|-
| Loss
| align=center| 6–3
| Viktor Nemkov
| Submission (guillotine choke)
| M-1 Challenge 36
| 
| align=center| 1
| align=center| 1:30
| Mytishchi, Russia
|
|-
| Loss
| align=center| 6–2
| Abdul-Kerim Edilov
| TKO (punches)
| Dictator Fighting Championship 1
| 
| align=center| 1
| align=center| 2:28
| Moscow, Russia
|
|-
| Win
| align=center| 6–1
| Dmitry Voitov
| Submission (triangle choke)
| M-1 Global: M-1 Fighter 2012 Quarterfinals
| 
| align=center| 1
| align=center| N/A
| Moscow, Russia
|
|-
| Win
| align=center| 5–1
| Jevgenij Lapin
| Submission (armbar)
| ProFC Grand Prix Global: Russia 2
| 
| align=center| 1
| align=center| 1:45
| Rostov Oblast, Russia
|
|-
| Win
| align=center| 4–1
| Igor Savelyev
| Submission (guillotine choke)
| Boets Cup 2011
| 
| align=center| 1
| align=center| 0:58
| Sochi, Russia
|
|-

| Win
| align=center| 3–1
| Artur Korchemny
| Submission (armbar)
| Boets Cup 2011
| 
| align=center| 1
| align=center| 0:42
| Sochi, Russia
|
|-
| Win
| align=center| 2–1
| Igor Sliusarchuk
| Submission (armbar)
| Boets Cup 2011
| 
| align=center| 1
| align=center| 0:25
| Sochi, Russia
|
|-
| Win
| align=center| 1–1
| Sergey Filimonov
| Submission (guillotine choke)
| M-1 Selection 2011: European Tournament
| 
| align=center| 2
| align=center| 0:51
| Makhachkala, Russia
|
|-
| Loss
| align=center| 0–1
| Adlan Amagov
| KO (punches)
| ProFC: Union Nation Cup 2
| 
| align=center| 1
| align=center| 4:05
| Rostov-on-Don, Russia
|
|-

See also
 List of male mixed martial artists
 Absolute Championship Berkut

References

External links
 
 

Living people
1987 births
Russian male mixed martial artists
Light heavyweight mixed martial artists
Sportspeople from Makhachkala
Dagestani mixed martial artists
Mixed martial artists utilizing sambo
Mixed martial artists utilizing freestyle wrestling
Mixed martial artists utilizing boxing
Mixed martial artists utilizing ARB
Avar people
Ultimate Fighting Championship male fighters